Reconciliation or reconcile may refer to:

Accounting
 Reconciliation (accounting)

Arts, entertainment, and media

Sculpture
 Reconciliation (Josefina de Vasconcellos sculpture), a sculpture by Josefina de Vasconcellos in Coventry Cathedral
 Reconciliation, a sculpture by Willem Vermandere in Nieuwpoort, Belgium

Television
 "Reconciliation" (Dynasty 1981), episode of soap opera
 "Reconciliation" (Dynasty 1985), episode of soap opera

Biology
 Reconciliation ecology, a branch of ecology that studies biodiversity in human-dominated ecosystems

Law
 Reconciliation (family law)
 Reconciliation (United States Congress), a legislative procedure in the United States Senate

Religion
 Reconciliation (theology), returning to faith or harmony after a conflict
 Reconciliation theology, political theology of how reconciliation can be brought into regions of conflict
 Sacrament of Penance, a sacrament of the Catholic Church also known as Reconciliation

People
 Reconcile (rapper) (born 1989), American rapper

Sociology and politics
 Reconciliation, improving respect between people of different cultural backgrounds as part of race relations
Reconciliation  in Australia, in 20th- and 21st-century politics
National Reconciliation Week

See also
Conciliation
 "Reconciled", song by Penal Colony on the album Put Your Hands Down
 Reconcilee, an émigré from Communist Czechoslovakia who later reconciled their relationship with the régime 
 Transitional Justice
Truth and reconciliation commission
 Vergangenheitsbewältigung, processes of dealing with the past in Germany
National Day for Truth and Reconciliation, Canadian holiday
Day of Reconciliation, South African holiday